Martin McIntyre (15 August 1847 – 28 February 1885) was an English first-class cricketer active 1868–78 who played for Nottinghamshire. He was born in Eastwood, Nottinghamshire; died in Moorgreen.

References

1847 births
1885 deaths
English cricketers
Nottinghamshire cricketers
Players of the North cricketers
North v South cricketers
All-England Eleven cricketers
Non-international England cricketers